Pirkhel is an administrative unit, known as a union council, of Malakand district in the Khyber Pakhtunkhwa province of Pakistan.

District Malakand has two tehsils, Swat Ranizai and Sam Ranizai. Each tehsil comprises certain numbers of union councils. There are 28 union councils in Malakand district.

External links

Khyber-Pakhtunkhwa Government website section on Lower Dir
Hajjinfo.org Uploads
PBS paiman.jsi.com

Malakand District
Populated places in Malakand District
Union councils of Khyber Pakhtunkhwa
Union Councils of Malakand District